Abidin bin Madingkir is a Malaysian politician who is serving as the State Assistant Minister. He has served as the Member of Sabah State Legislative Assembly (MLA) for Paginatan since May 2018. He is a member of the Homeland Solidarity Party (STAR) which is aligned with the ruling Perikatan Nasional (PN) coalition both in federal and state levels.

Election results

Honours

Honours of Malaysia 
  :
  Companion of the Order of Loyalty to the Crown of Malaysia (JSM) (2010)
  :
  Commander of the Order of Kinabalu (PGDK) - Datuk (1999)

References

Members of the Sabah State Legislative Assembly
Homeland Solidarity Party politicians
Living people
Year of birth missing (living people)